Whomanfoursays is the fourth studio album by Canadian singer Dalbello, and her first concept album.

Album information

Released in 1984, the album marked a change in direction in her musical career, away from the soul R&B image of her previous albums and toward a more individual and avant-garde sound. Dalbello wrote every track herself, and changed her recording name from Lisa Dal Bello to her last name only. Musician Mick Ronson, who collaborated extensively to the project, produced the album with her; all instruments were played by either or both of them.

The title is a pun on the words "human forces". The original vinyl album cover features in either black or white the name in faux Cyrillic letters; on the CD version, this was replaced with regular uppercase lettering. Lisa's face is featured on the cover painted in the style of the indigenous people of New Guinea. The sentence "This album was recorded with the Hughmann technique" was placed in the credits, though it was an invented term, meaning that humans were involved.

Three songs from this album were covered by notable artists: "Gonna Get Close to You" by progressive metal band Queensrÿche on Rage for Order (1986), "Wait for an Answer" by Heart on Bad Animals (1987), and "Animal" by German metal band Heavens Gate on Planet E (1996).

Track listing

Personnel
 Lisa Dal Bello - lead vocals, keyboards, bass, drums, percussion
 Mick Ronson - guitars, keyboards, bass
 Carole Pope - backing vocals on "Animal"
 John Forbes - Fairlight CMI sampler

Production
Produced by Mick Ronson and Dalbello
Engineered by Lenny Derose; additional engineering by Mick Walsh and Kevin Markland
Mixed by Dalbello, Lenny Derose & Mick Ronson
Mastered by George Marino
Deborah Samuel — photography
Joe Primeur — assistant
Heather Brown — art direction and design
Hand lettering by Mary Margaret O'Hara
All songs published by Dalbello Toonz.

Chart positions

References

1984 albums
Lisa Dalbello albums
Albums produced by Mick Ronson
Capitol Records albums